Yazoo County is a county located in the U.S. state of Mississippi. As of the 2020 census, the population was 26,743. The county seat is Yazoo City. It is named for the Yazoo River, which forms its western border. Its name is said to come from a Choctaw language word meaning "River of Death."

History
The area which is now Yazoo County was acquired by the State of Mississippi from the Choctaw Indians in 1820. Yazoo County was established on January 21, 1823. It was the 19th county established in the State of Mississippi, and remains the largest in area. It was developed for cotton plantations, and the first had access to the major river. The first county seat was at Beatties Bluff. In 1829, the county seat was moved to Benton. In 1849 the county seat was moved again, to Yazoo City, where it remains.

Yazoo County was a battlefield in 1863 and 1864 during the American Civil War. After the war, there was violence of whites against freedmen. Such violence continued after Reconstruction. In the period from 1877 to 1950, Yazoo County had 18 documented lynchings of African Americans. Most occurred around the turn of the 20th century, as part of white imposition of Jim Crow conditions and suppression of black voting.

In 1900 there was a railroad disaster that killed engineer Casey Jones; it took place in Yazoo County just north of Vaughan. The Great Mississippi Flood of 1927 did much damage in Yazoo County.

Geography
It is the largest county in Mississippi by land area and third-largest by total area.

Adjacent counties
 Humphreys County (north)
 Holmes County (northeast)
 Madison County (east)
 Hinds County (south)
 Warren County (southwest)
 Issaquena County (west)
 Sharkey County (northwest)

National protected area
 Hillside National Wildlife Refuge (part)
 Panther Swamp National Wildlife Refuge

Demographics

2020 census

As of the 2020 United States Census, there were 26,743 people, 8,542 households, and 5,203 families residing in the county.

2010 census
As of the 2010 United States Census, there were 28,065 people living in the county. 57.1% were Black or African American, 40.0% White, 0.4% Asian, 0.3% Native American, 0.7% of some other race and 1.5% of two or more races. 4.6% were Hispanic or Latino (of any race).

2000 census
As of the census of 2000, there were 28,149 people, 9,178 households, and 6,644 families living in the county. The population density was 31 people per square mile (12/km2). There were 10,015 housing units at an average density of 11 per square mile (4/km2). The racial makeup of the county was 53.96% Black or African American, 44.74% White, 0.20% Native American, 0.36% Asian, 0.22% from other races, and 0.52% from two or more races. 4.38% of the population were Hispanic or Latino of any race.

35.60% of the 9,178 households had children under the age of 18 living with them, 43.20% were married couples living together, 23.70% had a female householder with no husband present, and 27.60% were non-families. 24.50% of all households were made up of individuals, and 11.70% had someone living alone who was 65 years of age or older. The average household size was 2.81 and the average family size was 3.35.

In the county, the population was spread out, with 28.50% under the age of 18, 9.80% from 18 to 24, 29.20% from 25 to 44, 20.10% from 45 to 64, and 12.40% who were 65 years of age or older. The median age was 34 years. For every 100 females there were 103.60 males (boys).  For every 100 females age 18 and over, there were 103.60 males.

The median income for a household in the county was $24,795, and the median income for a family was $29,395. Males had a median income of $28,553 versus $19,797 for females. The per capita income for the county was $12,062.  About 25.40% of families and 31.90% of the population were below the poverty line, including 42.90% of those under age 18 and 22.50% of those age 65 or over.

Transportation

Major highways
  Interstate 55
  U.S. Highway 49
  U.S. Highway 49W
  U.S. Highway 49E
  Mississippi Highway 3
  Mississippi Highway 16
  Mississippi Highway 149
 Mississippi Highway 433

Airport

Education
 Public School Districts
 Yazoo City Municipal School District serves areas in the Yazoo City limits; its high school is Yazoo City High School
 Yazoo County School District serves areas outside of the Yazoo City limits; its high school is Yazoo County High School
 Private Schools
 Benton Academy (Benton)
 Manchester Academy (Yazoo City)
 Covenant Christian School (Yazoo City)
 Thomas Christian Academy (Yazoo City)

Politics

Communities

Cities
 Yazoo City (county seat)

Town
 Bentonia

Villages
 Eden
 Satartia

Census-designated place
 Benton

Unincorporated communities

 Anding
 Carter
 Holly Bluff
 Hopewell Landing
 Little Yazoo
 Midway
 Oil City
 Scotland
 Tinsley
 Vaughan

Ghost towns
 Claibornesville
 Hilton
 Liverpool
 Pearce
 Plumville

Popular culture
Yazoo County, Mississippi has been featured in an Independent Lens series documenting bullying.

Notable people

 Haley Barbour, Governor of Mississippi
 Willie Brown, football player
 Jerry Clower, comedian
 Henry Espy, Mayor of Clarksdale, Mississippi
 Mike Espy, former U.S. Secretary of Agriculture
 Lawrence Gordon, motion picture producer
 Lynn Hamilton, actress
 Jesse E. Holmes, minister, community leader
 Duck Holmes, blues musician
 T. J. Huddleston, entrepreneur
 Skip James, blues musician
 Tommy McClennan, blues musician
 Willie Morris, writer
 Stella Stevens, actress
 Zig Ziglar, writer and motivational speaker

See also

 List of counties in Mississippi
 National Register of Historic Places listings in Yazoo County, Mississippi

References

Further reading
 James L. Cox, The Mississippi Almanac. 2001.
 Harriet DeCell and JoAnne Prichard, Yazoo: Its Legends and Legacies. n.c.: Yazoo Delta Press, 1976.
 A.T. Morgan, Yazoo; or, On the Picket Line of Freedom in the South: A Personal Narrative. New York: Russell and Russell, 1968.
 Willie Morris, A Pictorial History of Yazoo County. n.c.: Heritage House Publishing, 1996.
 Nicholas Russell Murray, Yazoo County, Mississippi, 1845-1900. Hammond, LA: Hunting for Bears, c. 1982.
 New Orleans Exposition Committee, Official Information Respecting Yazoo County, Mississippi. Yazoo City, MS: n.p., 1884.
 
 Yazoo Historical Association, Yazoo County Story: A Pictorial History of Yazoo County, Mississippi, Covering Both the Old and the New. Fort Worth, TX: University Supply and Equipment Co., 1958.

External links
 
 Yazoo County Mississippi on RootsWeb.com
 Yazoo County Convention and Visitors Bureau

 
1823 establishments in Mississippi
Mississippi counties
Mississippi placenames of Native American origin
Populated places established in 1823
Black Belt (U.S. region)
Majority-minority counties in Mississippi